Carl Wilhelm Oseen (17 April 1879 in Lund – 7 November 1944 in Uppsala) was a theoretical physicist in Uppsala and Director of the Nobel Institute for Theoretical Physics in Stockholm.

Life
Oseen was born in Lund, and took a Fil. Kand. degree (B.Sc.) at Lund University in 1897 and a Filosophie licentiat in 1900.

He visited Göttingen in the winter of 1900–01, where he attended David Hilbert's lectures on partial differential equations. He was probably also influenced by the other famous mathematician in Göttingen, Felix Klein, and, on a later visit, by the hydrodynamicist Ludwig Prandtl. A great influence was also exercised by his teacher in Lund, A. V. Bäcklund.

In 1934 Oseen became a member of the American Mathematical Society.

Work
Oseen formulated the fundamentals of the elasticity theory of liquid crystals (Oseen elasticity theory), as well as the Oseen equations for viscous fluid flow at small Reynolds numbers. He gave his name to the Oseen tensor and, with Horace Lamb, to the Lamb–Oseen vortex. The Basset–Boussinesq–Oseen (BBO) equation describes the motion of – and forces on – a particle moving in an unsteady flow at low Reynolds numbers.

He was a Plenary Speaker of the ICM in 1936 in Oslo.

Nobel committee
Oseen was a member of the Royal Swedish Academy of Sciences from 1921, and a member of the Academy's Nobel Prize committee for physics from 1922. As a full professor of a Swedish university, Oseen also had the right to nominate Nobel Prize winners.

Oseen nominated Albert Einstein for the Nobel Prize in 1921, for Einstein's work on the photoelectric effect (rather than the more controversial theory of general relativity). Einstein was finally awarded the prize for 1921 when Oseen repeated the nomination in 1922.

Selected bibliography

See also
 Oseen equations
 Oseen's approximation
 Lamb–Oseen vortex
 Basset–Boussinesq–Oseen equation
 Ewald–Oseen extinction theorem

References

Further reading
 Broberg, Gunnar. (1984) "Before 1932: Scientists writing their own history". History of Science in Sweden: the Growth of a Discipline, 1932-1982. Uppsala: Uppsala Studies in the History of Science. pp 9–24.

1879 births
1944 deaths
Swedish physicists
Fluid dynamicists
Members of the Royal Swedish Academy of Sciences
Theoretical physicists
Members of the Royal Society of Sciences in Uppsala